Avenira is a Russian non-canonical female first name. Its masculine version is Avenir.

The diminutives of "Avenira" are Avenirka, Ava, Venya, Vena, Vira, and Nira.

References

Notes

Sources
Н. А. Петровский (N. A. Petrovsky). "Словарь русских личных имён" (Dictionary of Russian First Names). ООО Издательство "АСТ". Москва, 2005.